Langstone Windmill is a Grade II listed tower mill at Langstone, Hampshire in England. It has been converted to residential accommodation.

History

Langstone Mill was built around 1730. It worked in conjunction with a tide mill close by. The mill was derelict in 1934. By 1939 it had been converted to residential accommodation, with the tower tarred and a new cap constructed. The conversion was to a design by Ernst L. Freud with the first resident being Flora Twort.

Description

Langstone Mill is a four-storey tower mill which shows evidence of having been raised by a storey at some point. It had a hand winded domed cap and the four common sails were carried on a wooden windshaft.

References

External links

Windmill World webpage on Langstone Mill.

Windmills completed in 1730
Windmills in Hampshire
Tower mills in the United Kingdom
Grinding mills in the United Kingdom
Grade II listed buildings in Hampshire
Grade II listed windmills